Meleveetil Damodaran is an Indian corporate advisor and mentor and a former senior government official. He is a Director on the Boards of Larsen & Toubro, Hero MotoCorp, Tech Mahindra, CRISIL, Biocon and Experian India.

He is the founder Chairperson of Excellence Enablers Private Limited, a niche Corporate Governance advisory firm and the Founder and Managing Trustee of Non Executive Directors in Conversation Trust (NEDICT), an exclusive forum for Non-Executive Directors. He is the present Chairman of IndiGo.

Early life 

Meleveetil Damodaran was born in Palakkad district, Kerala, India in May, 1947. He attended Campion High School, Tiruchirapalli, and completing his pre-university in Loyola College, Chennai, he spent a little over 2 years at Indian Institute of Technology Madras. He graduated in Economics and Law from the Universities of Madras and Delhi respectively.

Career 
After 6 months each as a Probationary Officer in Indian Bank and State Bank of India, he joined the IAS - 1971 batch - in the Indian state of Tripura, where he served in different developmental and regulatory positions. He was appointed Tripura's Chief Secretary in 1992, when he became the youngest person ever in India to hold such a position in a State Government.
In 2001, he was appointed the Chairman of UTI to rescue India's largest and oldest investment institution, which had collapsed. He restored UTI to health in arguably the most successful turnaround story in Indian financial sector history. He was simultaneously given charge of IDBI, another of India's major financial institutions. Here, he created the Stressed Assets Stabilisation Fund, which helped clean IDBI's books, facilitating its conversion to a commercial bank and its merger with another bank.

As Chairman of SEBI, he brought improved corporate governance practices to India's securities market. Among his many contributions was the introduction of QIP, an instrument for follow on offerings which until then was going to external markets. While at SEBI, he was elected Chairman of the Emerging Markets Committee of the International Organization of Securities Commissions (IOSCO),[5] a position he held till he demitted office as Chairman, SEBI. He was the Chairman of Ministry of Corporate Affairs' Committee for Reforming the Regulatory Environment for facilitating the ease of doing Business in India.

He was also the Chairman of Reserve Bank of India's Committee on Customer Service in Banks. He chaired the Taskforce on Corporate Governance constituted by the Federation of Indian Chambers of Commerce and Industry (FICCI).

He was appointed Chairman of IndiGo (InterGlobe Aviation) on 24 January 2019.

References

External links 
 CIO Magazine India
 SOBHA Developers Board

1947 births
Living people